Lorna Elizabeth Lockwood  (March 24, 1903 – September 23, 1977) was an American lawyer and judge who served as justice (and at times chief justice) of the Arizona Supreme Court.

Born in what was then Arizona Territory, Lockwood was the daughter of Alfred Collins Lockwood, who later served as chief justice of the Arizona Supreme Court. Lockwood attended the University of Arizona and the University of Arizona College of Law before entering private practice and serving several terms in the Arizona House of Representatives. Lockwood spent a decade on the bench of the Arizona Superior Court in Maricopa County, the first woman to serve in that role. In 1960, Lockwood was elected to the Arizona Supreme Court. She served as chief justice from 1965 to 1966 and 1970 to 1971, become the first female chief justice of a state supreme court in the United States. She retired from the court in 1975 and died three years later.

Early life and education
Lockwood was born on March 24, 1903, in Douglas, Arizona Territory, a mining town, to Daisy Maude Lincoln and Alfred Collins Lockwood.

Her father was an attorney and later chief justice of the Arizona Supreme Court. In 1913, the family moved to Tombstone and Lorna graduated from Tombstone High School in 1920.

Lockwood received her B.A. from the University of Arizona in Tucson in 1923, where she was a Spanish major, and earned her J.D. from the University of Arizona College of Law in 1925. Lockwood was the only woman in her law-school class and the second woman to ever attend the school. She was elected president of the student bar association.

Legal and judicial career
Lockwood passed the Arizona State Bar and worked as a legal stenographer from 1925 until 1939. In 1939, she established the firm Lockwood & Savage with Loretta Savage Whitney in 1939. The two practiced together until 1942, when Lockwood began practicing with her brother-in-law, Z. Simpson Cox, and her father, who had by that time lost his campaign for reelection to the Arizona Supreme Court.

In 1938, Lockwood was recruited by the Business and Professional Women's Club to run for the Arizona House of Representatives. Lockwood won election and in 1940 won reelection. In 1942, Lockwood served as assistant to U.S. Representative John R. Murdock of Arizona. In 1944, Lockwood returned to Phoenix, Arizona, to assist the war effort as district price attorney for the Office of Price Administration. In 1946, after the end of World War II, Lockwood was returned to the Arizona House of Representative and became chair of the House Judiciary Committee and a member of the House Rules Committee. In 1947, Phoenix Mayor Ray Busey appointed Lockwood to the Charter Revision Committee, an important local post. In 1949, Lockwood left private practice to become assistant attorney general for Arizona, overseeing the state welfare department.

In 1950, Lockwood was elected a judge for the Arizona Superior Court in Maricopa County, the first woman to sit on the bench in that court. She served as the county's juvenile court judge from 1954 through 1957 before returning to the general county bench for the following three years.

In 1960, Lockwood challenged an incumbent justice of the Arizona Supreme Court. Lockwood campaigned around the state, traveling by airplane piloted by Virginia Hash, a fellow attorney.  Lockwood served as chief justice of the Supreme Court from 1965 to 1966 and again from 1970 to 1971. She was the first woman to become chief justice of a state supreme court.

In 1965 and 1967, when vacancies occurred on the U.S. Supreme Court, Senator Carl Hayden recommended her nomination to President Lyndon B. Johnson. Lockwood would have become the first woman and the first Arizonan to serve on the Court, but she did not receive a nomination. (The first woman appointed to the Court later became then-Arizona Court of Appeals Judge Sandra Day O'Connor, who was appointed in 1981).

Death
Lockwood retired from the court in 1975.  She died on September 23, 1977, at Phoenix’s Good Samaritan Hospital. The urn which holds her cremated remains is located in the Greenwood/Memory Lawn Mortuary & Cemetery south columbarium, niche #113. She was posthumously inducted into the Arizona Women's Hall of Fame in 1981.

See also

 List of female state supreme court justices

Notes

References
 Philip R. VanderMeer, "Lockwood, Lorna C (1903–1977)." in Encyclopedia of Women in the American West (eds. Gordon Moris Bakken & Brenda Farrington: SAGE, 2003), pp. 190–93.

External links
 Lorna Lockwood at Women's Legal History Biography Project at Stanford University
 Lorna Elizabeth Lockwood: In Pursuit of the 1967 U.S. Supreme Court Nomination
 Lorna Lockwood at Arizona Women's Heritage Trail

1903 births
1977 deaths
Chief Justices of the Arizona Supreme Court
Members of the Arizona House of Representatives
People from Douglas, Arizona
Women chief justices of state supreme courts in the United States
Women state legislators in Arizona
20th-century American judges
20th-century American women politicians
20th-century American politicians
Justices of the Arizona Supreme Court
20th-century American women judges